The 2021 Mala earthquake, with a Richter magnitude of 6.0 and moment magnitude of 5.9, struck on June 22, 2021, at 21:54:18 local time (UTC-5) with an epicenter off the coast of Mala in the department of Lima. Following the main event, there were more than 15 aftershocks, with the largest being a magnitude 4.8 event at 07:03 local time on June 23.

Initially, the earthquake was 5.8 magnitude, it was revised by the Instituto Geofísico del Perú (IGP) to 6.0 . It was felt strongly in Lima. The earthquake affected the Lima metropolitan area and the Cañete Province, killing a six-year-old boy due to a cardiorespiratory arrest, confirmed 1 day after the earthquake.

Tectonic setting
Peru lies above the destructive boundary where the Nazca Plate is being subducted beneath the South American Plate along the line of the Peru–Chile Trench.  The two plates are converging towards each other at a rate of about 78mm or 3 inches per year.

Damage

Some streets in Lima and Cañete Province were closed due to landslides in the houses, including the Costa Verde which closed due to one. Due to the earthquake, the Instituto Geofísico del Perú programmed an earthquake drill for June 29, 2021, at 10:00 a.m. (UTC−05:00).

In the Jorge Chávez International Airport and a Plaza Vea supermarket reported some damage to ceilings and items falling off shelves. In Costa Verde rockslides were reported.

See also 

2014 Peru earthquake
List of earthquakes in 2021
List of earthquakes in Peru
2022 Chilca earthquake  - a  5.4 earthquake that also impacted the Lima area.

References

External links 

IGP earthquake report

Earthquakes in Peru
2021 earthquakes	
2021 in Peru
2021 disasters in Peru